Cameron Norrie was the defending champion but chose not to defend his title.

Lloyd Harris won the title after defeating Marc Polmans 6–2, 6–2 in the final.

Seeds

Draw

Finals

Top half

Bottom half

References
Main Draw
Qualifying Draw

Stockton Challenger - Singles